Ouricury wax is a brown-colored wax obtained from the leaves of a Brazilian feather palm Syagrus coronata by scraping the leaf surface.

Harvesting
Harvesting ouricury wax is more difficult than harvesting carnauba wax, as ouricury wax does not flake off the surface of the leaves.

Properties and uses
The physical properties of ouricury wax resemble carnauba wax, so it can be used as a substitute where light color is not required, e.g. in carbon paper inks, molding lubricants and polishes. Its melting point is 81-84 °C.

Waxes